A tire-pressure gauge, or tyre-pressure gauge, is a pressure gauge used to measure the pressure of tires on a vehicle. Most passenger cars are recommended to have a tire pressure of 32 to 35 pounds per square inch when not warmed by driving.

Since tires are rated for specific loads at certain pressure, it is important to keep the pressure of the tire at the optimal amount. Tires are rated for their optimal pressure when cold, meaning before the tire has been driven on for the day and allowed to heat up, which ultimately changes the internal pressure of the tire due to the expansion of gases. The precision of a typical mechanical gauge as shown is ±. Higher precision gauges with ± uncertainty can also be obtained.

Tire-pressure monitoring systems 

Many modern cars now come with built-in tire pressure sensors that allow all four tire pressures to be read simultaneously from inside the car.  Before 2005, most on-board tire-pressure monitoring systems (TPMS) used indirect pressure monitoring.  The anti-lock brake sensors detect one tire rotating faster than the rest and indicate a low tire pressure to the driver. The problem with this method was that if tires all lost the same pressure then none would show up against the others to indicate a problem. However, research have shown that both direct and indirect tire pressure monitoring systems are equally effective.

Regulations on tire pressure 
Since September 2007 all new automobiles below  in weight sold in the United States are required to incorporate a Tire Pressure Monitoring System, which is capable of monitoring all four tires and simultaneously reporting under-inflation of 25 percent of cold placard pressures in any combination of all four tires. TPMS known as Direct TPMS are capable of TREAD Act legislation requiring simultaneous pressure measurement for each tire pressure.

References 

Pressure gauges
Tires